WBTP (95.7 FM) is an urban contemporary radio station that serves the Tampa Bay area that plays hip-hop, R&B, and soul music that aims towards the African American community. It is owned and operated by iHeartMedia. Its target audience is African Americans between the ages of 18–34, but its main competitor is WLLD, which has a very similar target audience as well. It was the home of former Russ Parr Morning Show co-host, Olivia Fox, who was host of the station's morning drive show from 2004 to mid-2006. Licensed to Clearwater, the station's studios are located in South Tampa and the transmitter site is in Gandy.

History
95.7 signed on in 1963 as WTAN-FM with an easy listening format, operating as an adjunct to its then-sister station, WTAN AM 1340. In the mid-1970s, the station became WOKF with a disco/dance format as "OK96", and later with the "Supermix 96" and "96 Fever" brandings. In 1980, after the death of disco, the station flipped to adult contemporary as WCKX, "96KX" (pronounced "96 Kicks"). In 1982, it re-branded as "Magic 96" with the WMGG call letters. In 1985, it re-branded again as "W-Lite 95.7" with the WNLT call letters, which later changed to "Lite Rock 95.7". On November 2, 1990, the station changed to Hot AC as "Mix 96" with the WMTX call letters. On August 4, 1997, the station changed to Modern AC as "Star 95.7" with the WSSR call letters.

On October 27, 2003, at 5 p.m., after stunting with a loop of directing listeners to sister stations WFLZ, WMTX and WXTB, WSSR flipped to Urban Contemporary as 95.7 the Beat with the current WBTP call letters. It remained jockless for nearly the first 4 months and received lukewarm reception from the African American community of the area.  However, the station has now beaten its closest competitor, WLLD, in ratings since late 2004, though not consistently. For example, WLLD claimed a ratings victory for Summer 2006 by .3 rating points, according to Arbitron. Former competition came from Urban AC-formatted WTMP, which flipped to a Spanish tropical format in September 2011.

In January 2019, WBTP began to add more classic tracks to its playlist, in preparation for the relaunch of WMTX-HD2's Throwback Tampa Bay under a new format.

As of October 1, 2019, WBTP-HD2 flipped from Quiet Storm to Alternative Rock as "Alt 95-7 HD2". The following day, WBTP added a third HD Radio subchannel, broadcasting a simulcast of AM sister station WDAE. On June 25, 2020, WBTP-HD2's Alternative Rock format was relocated to WXTB-HD3 as "Alt 98"; concurrently, WBTP-HD2 began airing iHeart's new African-American focused "Black Information Network" all-news radio service.

On-air personalities
 The Breakfast Club
 DJ Flee in the Bodega
 Mychal Maguire
 Anjali 'Queen B'
 The Keith Sweat Hotel 
 DJ Shizm
 DeLeon Richards-Sheffield

Mixers
 DJ Sandman
 DJ Shizm
 DJ Jimi-O

Station management
 General manager: Chris Soechtig
 Program director: Mychal Maguire

References

External links
Official Website

BTP
Urban contemporary radio stations in the United States
Radio stations established in 1963
1963 establishments in Florida
IHeartMedia radio stations